The Mantua Bog State Nature Preserve (or Mantua Swamp) is a  protected wetland in Mantua Township, Portage County in the U.S. state of Ohio. It was designated a National Natural Landmark in 1976 and a state nature preserve in 1990. The national landmark designation encompasses  which includes Marsh Wetlands State Nature Preserve, in addition to Mantua Bog State Nature Preserve.

The nature preserve includes different types of wetlands including swamp forest, boreal bog, and cattail marshes. Twenty-four state-listed plants have been identified in the bog including autumn willow (Salix serissima), bunchflower (Melanthium virginicum), and cranberry (Vaccinium oxycoccos). In 2000, the Ohio Odonata Survey found a breeding population of the brush-tipped emerald dragonfly (Somatochlora walshii), a species not previously known to exist in Ohio.

Access is by permit only (from the Division of Natural Areas and Preserves) due to the sensitivity of the wetland.

References 

Bogs of Ohio
National Natural Landmarks in Ohio
Ohio State Nature Preserves
Protected areas of Portage County, Ohio
Landforms of Portage County, Ohio
Protected areas established in 1990
1990 establishments in Ohio